The Crazies is a 2010 American horror film directed by Breck Eisner from a screenplay from Scott Kosar and Ray Wright. The film is a remake of the 1973 film of the same name and stars Timothy Olyphant, Radha Mitchell, Joe Anderson and Danielle Panabaker. George A. Romero, who wrote and directed the original, served as an executive producer. It is about a fictional Iowa town that becomes afflicted by a biological agent that turns those infected into violent killers. The film was released on February 26 and grossed $55 million on a $20 million budget.  The critical summary on Rotten Tomatoes calls it "tense, nicely shot, and uncommonly intelligent", and it received mixed reviews on Metacritic.

Plot 
In the town of Ogden Marsh, Iowa, sheriff David Dutton is enjoying a baseball game when it is interrupted by resident Rory entering the outfield with a shotgun. David attempts to dissuade him, but is forced to kill him when he raises his weapon. David's wife Judy, the community doctor, has begun to notice another resident, Bill, exhibiting bizarre behavior, including lifeless and repetitive speech. The next night, Bill locks his wife and son inside their farmhouse and burns it down.

Following the discovery of a pilot's body in a swamp, David and his deputy, Russell, investigate the area. They discover a military aircraft that crashed into the river a few days before. Suspecting a link between the contaminated water and the residents' bizarre behavior, David lobbies Mayor Hobbs to shut off the town's drinking water supply. He is denied, but does so anyway.

Soon after, all communication services are lost in town and soldiers arrive to quarantine all residents at a high school. The residents are examined for symptoms of infection, and Judy does not pass the examination due to elevated temperature because of her pregnancy and is separated from David. David escapes quarantine and returns to his office, encountering Russell. The pair head for the school to free Judy. At the school, infected townspeople breach the perimeter, and the military personnel evacuate, abandoning the civilians. Judy wakes up strapped to a gurney alongside several others, and school director Ben Sandborn enters and begins killing quarantined people. David and Russell arrive and kill Ben, freeing her and Becca, Judy's assistant.

Unable to find a working vehicle, the four make their way out of town on foot. They encounter Becca's boyfriend Scotty at his farm. Soldiers raid the farm, shoot Scotty and his mother, and burn their bodies. David subdues a soldier and learns that the military has been ordered to shoot all civilians. The group repairs a patrol car in David's garage and are ambushed in David's house by Rory's infected wife Peggy and son Curt. Peggy stabs David in the hand before he kills her, and Russell shoots Curt through a window. Russell shoots the pair's corpses multiple times, disturbing Judy.

David, Judy, Becca, and Russell flee in a car. On the road, they are spotted by an attack helicopter and drive into a car wash for cover. Employees at the car wash attack the car and drag Becca out by the neck with a hose, breaking her neck and killing her. When the rest of the group leaves the car to help her, the helicopter destroys the car.

While walking down the road, the group spots a black SUV speeding toward them, which Russell disables with a police spike strip. The driver, a government employee, reveals that the cargo plane contained a Rhabdoviridae prototype and biological weapon called Trixie. It was en route to Texas to be destroyed when the plane crashed. Enraged, Russell shoots him and threatens the Duttons. David confronts him about his behavior, and Russell realizes he is infected. Russell begs to continue with them. At a military roadblock, Russell distracts the soldiers and is killed, allowing the Duttons to sneak past.

David and Judy arrive at a truck stop to search for a vehicle, discovering that the military has also executed those who were evacuated. After killing more infected, they escape in a semi-truck. As they drive away, a massive explosion destroys Ogden Marsh and disables their truck, forcing them to continue on foot. A view from a military satellite highlights the couple and then the city, and the words "Initiate containment protocol" appear.

A Cedar Rapids newscaster reports on the explosion in Ogden Marsh, stating a perimeter has been set and civilians are not being allowed into the area. An infected person appears on camera before the signal is lost.

Cast

 Timothy Olyphant as David
 Radha Mitchell as Judy
 Joe Anderson as Russell
 Danielle Panabaker as Becca
 Christie Lynn Smith as Deardra Farnum
 Brett Rickaby as Bill Farnum
 Preston Bailey as Nicholas
 John Aylward as Mayor Hobbs
 Joe Reegan as Pvt. Billy Babcock
 Glenn Morshower as Intelligence Officer
 Larry Cedar as Ben Sandborn
 Gregory Sporleder as Travis Quinn
 Mike Hickman as Rory Hamill
 Lisa K. Wyatt as Peggy Hamill
 Justin Welborn as Curt Hamill

Lynn Lowry, who portrayed Kathy in the original film, makes a cameo appearance as an infected woman on a bicycle.

Production

Development
Paramount Pictures was the first studio to attempt a remake of The Crazies, with reports surfacing in May 2004. Dean Georgaris and Michael Aguilar would produce under their Penn Station Entertainment banner while George A. Romero would serve as an executive producer. Scott Kosar, who had worked on the remakes of The Texas Chainsaw Massacre and The Amityville Horror, was hired to pen the script. The film was said to "update the storyline of the original". In March 2005, The Machinist director Brad Anderson was in talks to direct the film. By April, Anderson was officially on board as director. Anderson and Kosar aimed to make a film that didn't feel "derivative" of the original film as well as 28 Days Later, which the former felt "set a new standard for zombie films". Creative differences with the studio would ultimately result in Anderson leaving the film.

In February 2008, the project was revived after Rogue Pictures picked up the film. Breck Eisner was to direct while Ray Wright, credited screenwriter of Pulse, was drafting a new script. The film was later moved to Overture Films by October.

Casting
In November 2008, Timothy Olyphant was cast in the lead role as the town's sheriff. Radha Mitchell joined the cast the following January, while Danielle Panabaker and Joe Anderson boarded the film in March.

Filming
Principal production began on March 5, 2009 in Georgia, with settings including the Georgia National Fairgrounds and Priester's Pecans in Perry, Georgia, the Fountain Car Wash in Macon, Georgia, areas in Dublin, Georgia, Peach County High School in Fort Valley, Georgia, and areas of Cordele, Georgia. Additional filming was done in Iowa. The special effects were created by Robert Green Hall.

Makeup 

The makeup for the film was designed by Almost Human Studios; they also did makeup for other horror films such as Quarantine, Frankenfish, and Prom Night. Director Breck Eisner's early visions of the infected were zombies. He and the makeup crew made many molds and sketches of the infected, with deformities and skin sloughing. Eventually, he grew tired of the cliche "zombie" look, and went with a realistic "go under the skin," in which the blood vessels appear to be bursting forth and face and neck muscles and tendons tight and wrought. Eisner described this look as "hyper alive."

The director's one and only rule for the makeup design—they research in medical books and consult medical professionals for the design of the infected. Lead make-up artist Rob Hall said "If we were to pitch something to Breck, about, if you know, one side of his face should look like this, Breck would immediately want to know what disease it came from, and what version of reality it could be implemented into Trixie. But the most important thing was to make sure it felt real. Make it feel like you could get it, too." The basis of the makeup the crew used was mainly rabies, tetanus, and Stevens–Johnson syndrome.

Each "Crazy" design had about twenty-one sections requiring over three hours to apply for the final effect seen in the film. Robert stated the final effect in the film seen was not just the makeup, but the lighting, camera angles, and post-production effects. The theme for the design was "stress." He stated he wanted the "Crazies" to look stressed. The veins and eyes were the main focus of the design. The contact lenses covered the actors' entire eyes and required eye-drops every five minutes to reduce injuries.

Release
The film premiered on February 24, 2010 in Los Angeles and received a wide release in the North America on February 26, 2010. The film opened at #3 behind Cop Out and Shutter Island with $16 million. By May 2010, the film has grossed an estimated $50 million worldwide. The Canadian DVD and Blu-ray Disc were released June 29, 2010. The DVD and Blu-ray Disc + Digital Copy combo pack was released in the North America on June 29, 2010 and in the UK on July 19.

Reception
On review aggregator Rotten Tomatoes, the film has a rating of 71% based on 148 reviews and an average rating of 6.4/10. The site's critical consensus reads, "Tense, nicely shot, and uncommonly intelligent, The Crazies is a horror remake that, unusually, works." On Metacritic, which assigns a rating to reviews, the film has an average score of 55 out of 100, based on 30 critics, indicating "mixed or average reviews". Audiences polled by CinemaScore gave the film an average grade of "B−" on an A+ to F scale.

Michael Phillips of The Chicago Tribune awarded the film 3½ stars of 4, adding he "greatly prefer this cleverly sustained and efficiently relentless remake to the '73 edition. It is lean and simple." Eric M. Armstrong of The Moving Arts Film Journal states "The Crazies is a solid B-movie and one of the few remakes surpassing the original."  Ty Burr of The Boston Globe gave the film 3/4 stars touting the film as "extremely solid stuff – about as good as you could hope from a B-movie re-tread." Variety film critic Dennis Harvey states it "emerges an above-average genre piece equal parts horror-meller and doomsday action thriller".

However, Owen Gleiberman of Entertainment Weekly graded the film a C, adding "I don't care how this premise is dressed, we saw it a jillion times." Mike Hale of The New York Times states "The filmmakers seem so determined to make a serious respectable horror movie, they have only the bare minimum of fun." Amy Biancolli, writing for San Francisco Chronicle states the re-make "boasts less of the plot and fewer characters than the original, but the hairdos are spiffier and the special effects graduated from cheapo stage blood to the extravagant gross-outs horror audiences expect."

At the People's Choice Awards, the film was nominated for Favorite Horror Movie.

Merchandise
A motion comic was released on February 17 via iTunes. A four-issue comic book miniseries was also released chronicling how the virus' spread.  The next week, an iPhone app, Beware the Infected, was released, and Starz Digital Media released a Facebook game.

See also
 The Crazies (1973 film)

References

External links

 
 
 
 
 

2010 films
2010s science fiction horror films
American science fiction horror films
2010s English-language films
D-Box motion-enhanced films
Remakes of American films
Emirati science fiction horror films
English-language Emirati films
Horror film remakes
Films about viral outbreaks
Films set in Iowa
Films shot in Iowa
Films shot in Georgia (U.S. state)
Overture Films films
Participant (company) films
Imagenation Abu Dhabi films
Films directed by Breck Eisner
Biological weapons in popular culture
Films scored by Mark Isham
2010s American films